Richard Thornburg may refer to:

 Richard Thornburg (fictional character), a fictional character in the Die Hard movies
 Dick Thornburgh (spelled with another "h"), a former Pennsylvania Governor and US Attorney General